Argentina competed at the 2015 World Championships in Athletics in Beijing, China, from August 22 to 30, 2015.

Results
(q – qualified, NM – no mark, SB – season best)

Men
Track and road events

Field events

Women
Field events

Sources 
Argentine team

Nations at the 2015 World Championships in Athletics
World Championships in Athletics
Argentina at the World Championships in Athletics